The Atkins Curling Supplies Classic (formerly the Atkins Curling Supplies Women's Classic and the Atkins Curling Supplies Charity Classic) is an annual bonspiel, or curling tournament, that takes place at the Assiniboine Memorial Curling Club in Winnipeg, Manitoba. The event has also been hosted by the Charleswood Curling Club in Winnipeg and the East St. Paul Curling Club in East St. Paul, Manitoba. The tournament is held in a round-robin format and was part of the World Curling Tour from 2012 to 2019. It began in 2007. Prior to this it was just part of the Manitoba Curling Tour.

A men's event was added for 2017.

While the 2020 event still occurred during the COVID-19 pandemic, it was discontinued as a World Curling Tour event.

Past champions

Women
''Only skip's name is displayed.

Men's

References

External links
Atkins Classic Home Page

Curling competitions in Winnipeg
2009 establishments in Manitoba